Andrei Yevgenyevich Ivashin (born 30 June 1999) is a Russian football player. He plays for FC Chayka Peschanokopskoye.

Club career
He made his debut in the Russian Professional Football League for FC Krasnodar-2 on 2 September 2017 in a game against FC Legion-Dynamo Makhachkala. He made his Russian Football National League debut for Krasnodar-2 on 17 July 2018 in a game against FC Sibir Novosibirsk.

References

External links
 

1999 births
People from Armavir, Russia
Living people
Russian footballers
Russia youth international footballers
Association football defenders
Russian First League players
Russian Second League players
FC Chayka Peschanokopskoye players
FC Krasnodar-2 players
Sportspeople from Krasnodar Krai